The SSL 1300, previously the LS-1300 and the FS-1300, is a satellite bus produced by Maxar Technologies. Total broadcast power ranges from 5 to 25 kW, and the platform can accommodate from 12 to 150 transponders.  The SSL 1300 is a modular platform and Maxar Technologies no longer reports designators for sub-versions, such as:  1300E, 1300HL, 1300S, 1300X.

First available in the late 1980s, the SSL 1300 platform underwent revision multiple times over its design life, all the while remaining a popular communications platform. The earliest models provided 5,000 RF watts of transmitter power, weighed 5,500 kg, and required a 4-meter diameter launch fairing. Newer models provide double that, approximately 10,000 RF watts of transmitter power, weigh 6,700 kg, and require a 5-meter diameter launch fairing.

SSL stated that they would use electric propulsion for North-South station keeping for the first time on the MBSat in 2004. The subsystem was supplied by International Space Technologies Inc and used Fakel's Hall thrusters and American and European propellant supply and electronics. According to Moog-ISP, the SSL 1300 platform uses its bipropellant thrusters.

In September 2015 SSL announced that it had delivered 100 satellites based on the SSL 1300 platform. There are more SSL 1300s currently providing service on orbit than any other model communications satellite.

SSL 1300 Firsts 
Over the last 25 years the SSL 1300 was the first platform to incorporate many innovations.
 It was the first satellite to use a 100-volt bus and Direct Radiating Collector (DRC) amplifiers, providing the higher power needed for direct-to-home television.
 It was the first true high-throughput satellite, an advance which now enables millions of people around the world to have access to relatively high speed broadband.
 It was the first to reach 20-kW of power, which enables satellite broadcast of today's HD and UltraHD television.
 It was the first satellite to provide two-way ground-based beam forming, which increases a satellite's flexibility to meet changing business requirements.
Other advances:
 The 1300 was one of the first platforms to use shaped antenna reflectors, which enable precisely defined coverage areas.
 The 1300 was the first Western satellite to use electric propulsion, which reduces mass allowing for more payload power or a less costly launch. Today there are 18 1300s with electric propulsion on orbit.
 The 1300 was one of the first platforms to incorporate lithium-ion batteries, which have 50 percent less mass than the nickel-hydrogen batteries they replaced and helped to enable higher power satellites.
 The world's two highest capacity broadband satellites currently providing service are built on the 1300 platform.

Satellite Orders

1300 Series

1300 Expanded Series

Cancelled

Failures

The SSL 1300 had a series of failures in 2001.  Since that time, electrical failures (Intelsat 7, PAS 6, Galaxy 27) and failure of the satellite's solar panels to properly deploy (Estrela do Sul 1, Telstar 14R, Intelsat 19) are recurring issues.

References

Satellite buses
SSL 1300